Colusa Rancheria (also, Cachildehe Rancheria) is an unincorporated community in Colusa County, California. It lies at an elevation of 59 feet (18 m).   As of the 2010 Census the population was 76.

References

Wintun
Unincorporated communities in California
Unincorporated communities in Colusa County, California
Native American populated places
1907 establishments in California